The men's changquan competition at the 1994 Asian Games in Hiroshima, Japan was held from 12 to 14 October at the Aki Ward Sports Center.

Schedule

Results

References 

Men's_changquan